Cedric Miller may refer to:

 Ced-Gee (born 1963), American hip hop producer and rapper 
 Cedric Miller (basketball) (born 1964), Bahamian-French basketball player